Canyon Climber is a video game designed by Steve Bjork and James Garon for the TRS-80 Color Computer and published by Tandy Corporation in 1982. Ports to other home computers were published by Datasoft. Canyon Climber is a three-screen platform game with an American Southwest theme. Two of the screens are direct analogs of those in Donkey Kong. 

The game was ported to the Atari 8-bit family by Tim Ferris, the Apple II by Brian Mountford, and PC-6001. The box art is by Scott Ross.

Gameplay

Canyon Climber consists of three non-scrolling screens that are endlessly cycled through. In the first, similar to the rivet screen from Donkey Kong, the goal is to place explosive charges on both ends of each of four bridges, using ladders to climb between them, then trigger a detonator. Goats pursue the player and can be jumped over. The second screen resembles Donkey Kong's opening level, with angled platforms and connecting ladders. Native Americans ("Indians" in the manual) on each platform shoot arrows which can be jumped or avoided. The goal is to reach the top. The objective of the third screen is to climb to the top while avoiding bricks dropped by birds.

The soundtrack of the first screen is a musical adaptation of the Prelude section from Prelude and Fugue in C minor, BWV 847.

Reception
The 1983 book The Creative Atari stated, "Canyon Climber achieves a cartoon-like atmosphere in the rendering of its various screens, to very pleasing effect," concluding "You will spend a while with Canyon Climber." In a review of four Atari 8-bit Datasoft games (alongside Pacific Coast Highway, Clowns and Balloons, and Shooting Gallery), Charles Brannon of COMPUTE! wrote, "the overall animation and execution are perhaps the best of the four." Electronic Fun with Computers & Games described Canyon Climber as "not quite as demanding as Donkey Kong, but the concept is appealingly bizarre," and called the game "short-term addictive." ANALOG Computing wrote, "The details and playability of the game are very good" and rated the graphics a 10 out of 10.

Reviewing the TRS-80 Color Computer version for Creative Computing, Stephen B. Gray warned, "Canyon Climber is a game for the expert or the masochist."

Long after the game's initial release, Keita Iida noted the low difficulty level, calling the game "perfectly suited for beginning players who are just getting into platform/climbing games." Mark Sabbatini, looking at the Color Computer version, agrees: "as soon as you've completed the levels a few times the challenge is pretty much gone." He also disliked the randomness of the rocks and goats, stating "all too often whether you live or die is all about luck and not about skill and planning."

Legacy
One section of Llamasoft's 2011 GoatUp game for iOS is an homage to Canyon Climber.

References

External links
Canyon Climber at Atari Mania

1982 video games
Atari 8-bit family games
Apple II games
Datasoft games
NEC PC-6001 games
Platform games
TRS-80 Color Computer games
Video games developed in the United States
Video games set in Arizona
Single-player video games